Brachytarsophrys popei is a species of frog in the family Megophryidae. It is found in southern China.

Range
Brachytarsophrys popei was found in:
Mount Jinggang, Jiangxi Province
Taoyuandong Nature Reserve, Hunan Province
Yizhang County, Hunan Province
Nanling Nature Reserve, Guangdong Province

References

popei
Amphibians of China
Endemic fauna of China
Amphibians described in 2014